Çelebili is a village in Toroslar district  of Mersin Province, Turkey, which is a part of Greater Mersin. It is situated in the lower slopes of the Taurus Mountains and close to an artificial lake. The population of Çelebili was 230 as of 2012. The village is a relatively recent settlement. Before being declared a village in 1955, it was a hamlet near Musalı, and the name of the settlement probably refers to a letter writer of the settlement who was called Çelebi, an Ottoman-era title meaning "gentleman."

References

Villages in Toroslar District